Bernard R. Novak (August 3, 1919 – March 11, 2010) was a Democratic member of the Pennsylvania House of Representatives.

References

1919 births
2010 deaths
People from Duquesne, Pennsylvania
Democratic Party members of the Pennsylvania House of Representatives